Willem Pieter Blockmans (born 26 May 1945, Antwerp, Belgium) was Professor of Medieval History at Leiden University between 1987 and 2010. He earned a PhD from the University of Ghent. He has been Rector of the Netherlands Institute for Advanced Study since September 2002. He has published extensively on late medieval and early modern state power.

Blockmans was elected a member of the Royal Netherlands Academy of Arts and Sciences in 1990. In 1996 he was elected a member of the Academia Europaea. Blockmans was elected a corresponding Fellow of the British Academy in 2003. In 2008 he was made Knight of the Order of the Netherlands Lion.

His retirement was marked with two Festschriften, Power and Persuasion: Essays on the Art of State Building in Honour of W.P. Blockmans, edited by Peter Hoppenbrouwers, Antheun Janse and Robert Stein (Turnhout, Brepols, 2010), and Bourgondië voorbij: De Nederlanden, 1250–1650. Liber alumnorum Wim Blockmans, edited by Mario Damen and Louis Sicking (Hilversum, Verloren, 2010).

Publications
with Charles Tilly, Cities and the Rise of States in Europe, A.D. 1000 to 1800 (1994)
Emperor Charles V, 1500-1558 (London 2002)
Introduction to Medieval Europe 300-1550 (London/New York 2007)
with Walter Prevenier, The Promised Lands: The Low Countries Under Burgundian Rule, 1369-1530 (2010)

References

External links
 Leiden University
 NIAS

1945 births
Corresponding Fellows of the British Academy
Flemish academics
Ghent University alumni
Knights of the Order of the Netherlands Lion
Academic staff of Leiden University
Living people
Members of Academia Europaea
Members of the Royal Netherlands Academy of Arts and Sciences
Writers from Antwerp